A , also called , is a person responsible for the maintenance of a  as well as for leading worship of a given .

History 
Later the term evolved to being synonymous with  - a man who works at a shrine and holds religious ceremonies there.

In ancient times, because of the overlap of political and religious power within a clan, it was the head of the clan who led the clansmen during religious functions, or else it could be another official. Later, the role evolved into a separate and more specialized form.

Description 

 can marry, and their children usually inherit their position. Although this hereditary status is no longer legally granted, it continues in practice.

Vestments and ritual objects 
This detail reveals the close connection between  worship and the figure of the Emperor. Other implements used by  include a baton called  and a wand decorated with white paper streamers called .

Education 
Women can also become , and widows can succeed their husbands in their job.

See also

References

External links 

 Kannushi, Encyclopedia of Shinto

 
Religious occupations
Shinto in Japan
Japanese words and phrases